Grayson Springs, or Grayson Springs Inn and Resort, in Grayson County, Kentucky south of Clarkson, dates from 1825.  It was listed on the National Register of Historic Places in 1978.  The listing included one contributing site and one contributing building.

It is a "once famous sulphur springs spa established in 1832, originally consisted of a two-story hotel of logs located near what is the Inn's
present entrance."

In 1976 what remained included well casings and a remodelled building which formerly contained a bowling alley at the spa, and was later used as a post office, general store, and house.

References

National Register of Historic Places in Grayson County, Kentucky
Tourist attractions in Grayson County, Kentucky
1832 establishments in Kentucky
Hotel buildings completed in 1832
Hotel buildings on the National Register of Historic Places in Kentucky
Log buildings and structures on the National Register of Historic Places in Kentucky
Former buildings and structures in Kentucky
Springs of Kentucky